Borjgali (⟨֎ ֍⟩ ; also Borjgala or Borjgalo; Borçgali in Laz) is a Georgian symbol of the Sun and eternity. The borjgali is often represented with seven rotating wings over the tree of life which can be used to create various shapes and variations and can be considered as a main symbol of Georgian culture.

Etymology

The term Borjgali is believed to derive from Megrelian word ბარჩხალი (barchkhali), which literally means "strong shining". Some other scholars believe that it has different origins. In old Megrelian borj means "time" and gal means "pass" or "flow". So the whole phrase would mean "the flow of time".

Usage
This pre-Christian symbol was widely used in both western (Colchis) and eastern Georgia (in Georgian architecture's Dedabodzi, "mother-pillar") as part of a Darbazi in the Kura–Araxes culture as a holy symbol. During the medieval period, this symbol was incorporated as a part of Christian symbolism.

Nowadays, the symbol is used in Georgian IDs and passports, as well as on currency and by the Georgian Rugby Union. Georgian rugby team players are called ბორჯღალოსნები (borjgalosnebi), which means "Men bearing Borjgali". It was also used on the naval ensign of Georgia during the late 1990s and early 2000s. Georgian nationalists often use symbol to emphasize national pride.

Gallery

See also 

Laz people
Armenian eternity sign
Hilarri
Lauburu
Swastika
Triskelion
Western use of the swastika in the early 20th century

References

Further reading
 Symbol dictionary  
 Historical Dictionary of Georgia, Alexander Mikaberidze
 T. Wilson „The swastika, the earliest known symbol and its migrations“ Wosh. 1990
 Transcaucasian Banknotes, Arutiun Airapetian, p. 52

Culture of Georgia (country)
Georgian words and phrases
Symbols
Rotational symmetry
National symbols of Georgia (country)
Georgian mythology